Corylopsis is a genus of nearly 30 species of shrubs in the witch hazel family, Hamamelidaceae, native to eastern Asia with the majority of species endemic to China but with some also in Japan, Korea, and the Himalayas. This genus is also known from the extinct species Corylopsis reedae described from Eocene leaf fossils found in Washington State, USA.

The fruit is a dry capsule 10–12 mm long, containing two glossy black seeds.

Selected speciesNative to China unless otherwise indicated

Cultivation and uses

They are often grown in gardens for their very early, yellow flowers. They do have weak branches though, which are often damaged by heavy snow loads. Corylopsis prefers to grow in semi-shade or shade, protected from strong winds. It grows best on humus-rich soils. The sweetly scented flowering branches keep well in a vase. Corylopsis also makes good bonsai plants, especially C. pauciflora.

References
Radtke,Meghan G., Pigg, Kathleen B., & Wehr, Wesley C. (2005); "Fossil Corylopsis and Fothergilla leaves (Hamamelidaceae) from the Lower Eocene flora of Republic, Washington, U.S.A., and their evolutionary and biogeographic significance" International Journal of Plant Sciences 166(2):347–356
Flora of China: Corylopsis

Hamamelidaceae
Saxifragales genera